This is a list of British television related events from 1949.

Events

January – June
No events.

July
July – BBC Television revives the regular televised weather forecast.

August
No events.

September
29 September – The BBC Television Service first broadcasts Come Dancing, a TV ballroom dancing competition show.

October
26 October – How Do You View?, the first comedy series on British television, starring Terry-Thomas, is first broadcast.

November
No events.

December
17 December – The Sutton Coldfield television transmitter is opened in the Midlands, making it the first part of the UK outside London to receive the BBC Television Service.
31 December – BBC television ends the day with a brief live broadcast of 20 sleeping babies in St Thomas' Hospital, London.

Debuts
25 January – The Time Machine (1949)
10 June – Triple Bill (1949) (trio of plays: Witness For the Prosecution; The Call To Arms; and Box For One)
29 September – Come Dancing (1949–1998)
26 October – How Do You View? (1949–1953)
27 November – By Candlelight (1949)
25 December – Miranda (1949)

Continuing television shows

1920s
BBC Wimbledon (1927–1939, 1946–2019, 2021–2024)

1930s
Picture Page (1936–1939, 1946–1952)
For the Children (1937–1939, 1946–1952)
The Boat Race (1938–1939, 1946–2019)
BBC Cricket (1939, 1946–1999, 2020–2024)

1940s
Kaleidoscope (1946–1953)
Muffin the Mule (1946–1955, 2005–2006)
Café Continental (1947–1953)
Television Newsreel (1948–1954)

Births
 13 March – David Neilson, actor
 30 March – Sue Cook, broadcaster and author
 29 April – Anita Dobson, actress
 2 May – Alan Titchmarsh, gardener and television presenter
 13 May – Zoë Wanamaker, American-born actress
 21 May – Andrew Neil, Scottish journalist and broadcaster
 22 May – Cheryl Campbell, film, television and stage actor
 5 July – Sue Robbie, television presenter
 16 August – John McArdle, actor
 25 August – Ross Davidson, actor (died 2006)
 2 September – Moira Stuart, broadcast presenter
 10 September – Freddy Marks, actor, singer and musician (died 2021)
 19 September – Twiggy, model and television presenter
 23 September – Floella Benjamin, Trinidad-born children's TV presenter and actress
 6 October – Sarah Cullen, television and radio journalist (died 2012)
 20 October – Jane Tucker, actress, singer and musician
 12 December – Bill Nighy, actor
 13 December – Robert Lindsay, actor
 David Stafford, writer and broadcaster

Deaths
10 June – Sir Frederick Ogilvie, Director General of the BBC, aged 57

See also
 1949 in British music
 1949 in the United Kingdom
 List of British films of 1949

References